The 2009–10 Miami Heat season was the 22nd season of the franchise in the National Basketball Association (NBA). The Heat made the playoffs for the second straight year under Erik Spoelstra. They failed to make it out of the first round once again as they were overpowered by a Boston Celtics squad that featured Kevin Garnett, Paul Pierce, and Ray Allen in five games. Boston eventually lost in seven games to the Los Angeles Lakers in the NBA Finals. Following the season, the Heat would acquire LeBron James and Chris Bosh to join Dwyane Wade and create a Big Three that lasted until 2014.

Key dates 
 June 25 – The 2009 NBA draft took place in New York City.
 July 8 – The free agency period started.
 October 5 – The Heat played their first preseason game on the road against the Detroit Pistons at the Palace of Auburn Hills.
 October 27 – The Heat's regular season began with a home game versus the New York Knicks.
 April 17 – The Heat began the first round of the playoffs against the Boston Celtics at TD Garden.

Offseason

2009 NBA Draft

Transactions

Roster

Pre-season

Regular season

Standings

Record vs. opponents

Game log 

|- bgcolor="#bbffbb"
| 1
| October 28
| New York
| 
| Dwyane Wade (26)
| Jermaine O'Neal (12)
| Dwyane Wade (5)
| American Airlines Arena19,600
| 1–0
|- bgcolor="#bbffbb"
| 2
| October 30
| @ Indiana
| 
| Dwyane Wade (32)
| Jermaine O'Neal (12)
| Mario Chalmers (6)
| Conseco Fieldhouse18,165
| 2–0

|- bgcolor="#bbffbb"
| 3
| November 1
| Chicago
| 
| Dwyane Wade (25) (reaches 10,000 career points)
| Michael Beasley, Udonis Haslem (11)
| Mario Chalmers (4)
| American Airlines Arena15,865
| 3–0
|- bgcolor="#ffcccc"
| 4
| November 3
| Phoenix
| 
| Dwyane Wade (23)
| Udonis Haslem (13)
| Dwyane Wade (7)
| American Airlines Arena15,105
| 3–1
|- bgcolor="#bbffbb"
| 5
| November 4
| @ Washington
| 
| Dwyane Wade (40)
| Quentin Richardson (9)
| Mario Chalmers (8)
| Verizon Center17,413
| 4–1
|- bgcolor="#bbffbb"
| 6
| November 6
| Denver
| 
| Dwyane Wade (22)
| Udonis Haslem (10)
| Dwyane Wade (5)
| American Airlines Arena19,600
| 5–1
|- bgcolor="#bbffbb"
| 7
| November 10
| Washington
| 
| Dwyane Wade (41)
| Jermaine O'Neal (6)
| Mario Chalmers, Dwyane Wade (5)
| American Airlines Arena15,154
| 6–1
|- bgcolor="#ffcccc"
| 8
| November 12
| Cleveland
| 
| Dwyane Wade (36)
| Jermaine O'Neal (9)
| Mario Chalmers (6)
| American Airlines Arena19,600
| 6–2
|- bgcolor="#bbffbb"
| 9
| November 14
| New Jersey
| 
| Udonis Haslem (28)
| Udonis Haslem (12)
| Dwyane Wade (6)
| American Airlines Arena17,124
| 7–2
|- bgcolor="#ffcccc"
| 10
| November 17
| Oklahoma City
| 
| Dwyane Wade (22)
| Jermaine O'Neal (10)
| Dwyane Wade (7)
| American Airlines Arena14,443
| 7–3
|- bgcolor="#ffcccc"
| 11
| November 18
| @ Atlanta
| 
| Michael Beasley (21)
| Michael Beasley (8)
| Dwyane Wade (4)
| Philips Arena18,729
| 7–4
|- bgcolor="#ffcccc"
| 12
| November 20
| @ Toronto
| 
| Mario Chalmers, Dwyane Wade (30)
| Michael Beasley (12)
| Dwyane Wade (8)
| Air Canada Centre19,800
| 7–5
|- bgcolor="#bbffbb"
| 13
| November 22
| New Orleans
| 
| Dwyane Wade (31)
| Michael Beasley (9)
| Mario Chalmers (9)
| American Airlines Arena16,500
| 8–5
|- bgcolor="#bbffbb"
| 14
| November 25
| @ Orlando
| 
| Dwyane Wade (24)
| Jermaine O'Neal (16)
| Dwyane Wade (6)
| Amway Arena17,461
| 9–5
|- bgcolor="#ffcccc"
| 15
| November 27
| Washington
| 
| Mario Chalmers (20)
| Jermaine O'Neal (13)
| Dwyane Wade (6)
| American Airlines Arena17,684
| 9–6
|- bgcolor="#ffcccc"
| 16
| November 29
| Boston
| 
| Dwyane Wade (27)
| Jermaine O'Neal (10)
| Dwyane Wade (6)
| American Airlines Arena18,104
| 9–7

|- bgcolor="#bbffbb"
| 17
| December 1
| @ Portland
| 
| Michael Beasley (27)
| Quentin Richardson (9)
| Dwyane Wade (12)
| Rose Garden20,417
| 10–7
|- bgcolor="#ffcccc"
| 18
| December 3
| @ Denver
| 
| Dwyane Wade (25)
| Dwyane Wade (10)
| Dwyane Wade (4)
| Pepsi Center14,998
| 10–8
|- bgcolor="#ffcccc"
| 19
| December 4
| @ L.A. Lakers
| 
| Dwyane Wade (26)
| Jermaine O'Neal (10)
| Dwyane Wade (9)
| Staples Center18,997
| 10–9
|- bgcolor="#bbffbb"
| 20
| December 6
| @ Sacramento
| 
| Dwyane Wade (34)
| Udonis Haslem (6)
| Dwyane Wade (10)
| ARCO Arena13,186
| 11–9
|- bgcolor="#ffcccc"
| 21
| December 11
| Dallas
| 
| Dwyane Wade (28)
| Michael Beasley, Dwyane Wade (11)
| Dwyane Wade (5)
| American Airlines Arena18,703
| 11–10
|- bgcolor="#ffcccc"
| 22
| December 13
| Memphis
| 
| Dwyane Wade (25)
| Mario Chalmers (5)
| Mario Chalmers (5)
| American Airlines Arena14,465
| 11–11
|- bgcolor="#bbffbb"
| 23
| December 15
| Toronto
| 
| Michael Beasley (28)
| Michael Beasley (11)
| Mario Chalmers (8)
| American Airlines Arena15,106
| 12–11
|- bgcolor="#bbffbb"
| 24
| December 17
| Orlando
| 
| Dwyane Wade (25)
| Michael Beasley, Dorell Wright (8)
| Dwyane Wade, Carlos Arroyo (7)
| American Airlines Arena18,303
| 13–11
|- bgcolor="#ffcccc"
| 25
| December 20
| Portland
| 
| Dwyane Wade (28)
| Michael Beasley, Udonis Haslem (8)
| Dwyane Wade (10)
| American Airlines Arena16,500
| 13–12
|- bgcolor="#bbffbb"
| 26
| December 23
| Utah
| 
| Dwyane Wade (29)
| Udonis Haslem (11)
| Dwyane Wade (5)
| American Airlines Arena19,600
| 14–12
|- bgcolor="#bbffbb"
| 27
| December 25
| @ New York
| 
| Dwyane Wade (30)
| Dwyane Wade (9)
| Dwyane Wade (5)
| Madison Square Garden19,763
| 15–12
|- bgcolor="#bbffbb"
| 28
| December 27
| Indiana
| 
| Dwyane Wade (25)
| Quentin Richardson (9)
| Dwyane Wade (6)
| American Airlines Arena19,600
| 16–12
|- bgcolor="#ffcccc"
| 29
| December 30
| @ New Orleans
| 
| Dwyane Wade (22)
| Jermaine O'Neal (9)
| Dwyane Wade (6)
| New Orleans Arena17,301
| 16–13
|- bgcolor="#ffcccc"
| 30
| December 31
| @ San Antonio
| 
| Michael Beasley (26)
| Michael Beasley (8)
| Dwyane Wade (6)
| AT&T Center18,581
| 16–14

|- bgcolor="#ffcccc"
| 31
| January 2
| Charlotte
| 
| Dwyane Wade (29)
| Udonis Haslem (10)
| Dwyane Wade (11)
| American Airlines Arena17,856
| 16–15
|- bgcolor="#bbffbb"
| 32
| January 4
| Atlanta
| 
| Dwyane Wade (28)
| Quentin Richardson (10)
| Mario Chalmers (6)
| American Airlines Arena16,500
| 17–15
|- bgcolor="#ffcccc"
| 33
| January 6
| Boston
| 
| Dwyane Wade (44)
| Udonis Haslem (9)
| Dwyane Wade (7)
| American Airlines Arena19,600
| 17–16
|- bgcolor="#bbffbb"
| 34
| January 8
| @ Phoenix
| 
| Dwyane Wade (33)
| Michael Beasley (10)
| Dwyane Wade (8)
| U.S. Airways Center18,422
| 18–16
|- bgcolor="#ffcccc"
| 35
| January 10
| @ L.A. Clippers
| 
| Dwyane Wade (24)
| Jamal Magloire (8)
| Quentin Richardson (3)
| Staples Center19,060
| 18–17
|- bgcolor="#ffcccc"
| 36
| January 11
| @ Utah
| 
| Michael Beasley (20)
| Udonis Haslem (12)
| Dwyane Wade (6)
| EnergySolutions Arena19,284
| 18–18
|- bgcolor="#bbffbb"
| 37
| January 13
| @ Golden State
| 
| Dwyane Wade (35)
| Udonis Haslem (9)
| Dwyane Wade (9)
| Oracle Arena17,121
| 19–18
|- bgcolor="#bbffbb"
| 38
| January 15
| @ Houston
| 
| Dwyane Wade (37)
| Jermaine O'Neal (13)
| Dwyane Wade (8)
| Toyota Center16,720
| 20–18
|- bgcolor="#ffcccc"
| 39
| January 16
| @ Oklahoma City
| 
| Michael Beasley (28)
| Jermaine O'Neal (9)
| Dwyane Wade (6)
| Ford Center18,203
| 20–19
|- bgcolor="#bbffbb"
| 40
| January 19
| Indiana
| 
| Dwyane Wade (32)
| Michael Beasley (10)
| Dorell Wright (5)
| American Airlines Arena14,986
| 21–19
|- bgcolor="#ffcccc"
| 41
| January 20
| @ Charlotte
| 
| Dwyane Wade (16)
| Dorell Wright (7)
| Rafer Alston (4)
| Time Warner Cable Arena14,212
| 21–20
|- bgcolor="#bbffbb"
| 42
| January 22
| @ Washington
| 
| Dwyane Wade (32)
| Michael Beasley (8)
| Dwyane Wade (10)
| Verizon Center20,173
| 22–20
|- bgcolor="#bbffbb"
| 43
| January 23
| Sacramento
| 
| Dwyane Wade (27)
| Michael Beasley (13)
| Dwyane Wade (8)
| American Airlines Arena18,521
| 23–20
|- bgcolor="#ffcccc"
| 44
| January 25
| Cleveland
| 
| Dwyane Wade (32)
| Dwyane Wade (10)
| Dwyane Wade (5)
| American Airlines Arena19,600
| 23–21
|- bgcolor="#ffcccc"
| 45
| January 27
| @ Toronto
| 
| Dwyane Wade (35)
| Udonis Haslem (11)
| Dwyane Wade (10)
| Air Canada Centre18,265
| 23–22
|- bgcolor="#bbffbb"
| 46
| January 29
| @ Detroit
| 
| Dwyane Wade (22)
| Jermaine O'Neal (11)
| Rafer Alston (7)
| The Palace of Auburn Hills20,669
| 24–22
|- bgcolor="#ffcccc"
| 47
| January 30
| @ Milwaukee
| 
| Dwyane Wade (21)
| Jermaine O'Neal(10)
| Dwyane Wade (7)
| Bradley Center18,717
| 24–23

|- bgcolor="#ffcccc"
| 48
| February 1
| Milwaukee
| 
| Dwyane Wade (23)
| Udonis Haslem (10)
| Dwyane Wade (6)
| American Airlines Arena15,858
| 24–24
|- bgcolor="#ffcccc"
| 49
| February 3
| @ Boston
| 
| Dwyane Wade (30)
| Udonis Haslem (8)
| Dwyane Wade (13)
| TD Garden18,624
| 24–25
|- bgcolor="#ffcccc"
| 50
| February 4
| @ Cleveland
| 
| Dwyane Wade (24)
| Michael Beasley (12)
| Dwyane Wade (9)
| Quicken Loans Arena20,562
| 24–26
|- bgcolor="#ffcccc"
| 51
| February 6
| @ Chicago
| 
| Jermaine O'Neal (24)
| Jermaine O'Neal (16)
| Dwyane Wade (8)
| United Center22,352
| 24–27
|- bgcolor="#bbffbb"
| 52
| February 9
| Houston
| 
| Dwyane Wade (17)
| Udonis Haslem (14)
| Dwyane Wade (7)
| American Airlines Arena18,654
| 25–27
|- bgcolor="#bbffbb"
| 53
| February 10
| @ Atlanta
| 
| Jermaine O'Neal (19)
| Udonis Haslem (12)
| Dwyane Wade (11)
| Philips Arena17,074
| 26–27
|- bgcolor="#bbffbb"
| 54
| February 16
| @ Philadelphia
| 
| Dwyane Wade (24)
| Quentin Richardson (10)
| Carlos Arroyo (7)
| Wachovia Center15,602
| 27–27
|- bgcolor="#bbffbb"
| 55
| February 17
| @ New Jersey
| 
| Michael Beasley (23)
| Quentin Richardson (14)
| Rafer Alston (5)
| IZOD Center12,251
| 28–27
|- bgcolor="#bbffbb"
| 56
| February 19
| @ Memphis
| 
| Michael Beasley (30)
| Jermaine O'Neal, Quentin Richardson (8)
| Carlos Arroyo (6)
| FedEx Forum16,127
| 29–27
|- bgcolor="#ffcccc"
| 57
| February 20
| @ Dallas
| 
| Daequan Cook (22)
| Jermaine O'Neal (13)
| Mario Chalmers (8)
| American Airlines Center20,328
| 29–28
|- bgcolor="#ffcccc"
| 58
| February 23
| Minnesota
| 
| Dorell Wright (26)
| Michael Beasley (9)
| Mario Chalmers (5)
| American Airlines Arena15,854
| 29–29
|- bgcolor="#ffcccc"
| 59
| February 27
| Milwaukee
| 
| Jermaine O'Neal (14)
| Udonis Haslem (9)
| Daequan Cook (3)
| American Airlines Arena18,883
| 29–30
|- bgcolor="#ffcccc"
| 60
| February 28
| @ Orlando
| 
| Dwyane Wade (21)
| Quentin Richardson (10)
| Dwyane Wade (5)
| Amway Arena17,461
| 29–31

|- bgcolor="#bbffbb"
| 61
| March 2
| Golden State
| 
| Dwyane Wade (35)
| Jermaine O'Neal (12)
| Dwyane Wade (12)
| American Airlines Arena15,213
| 30–31
|- bgcolor="#bbffbb"
| 62
| March 4
| L.A. Lakers
| 
| Dwyane Wade (27)
| Udonis Haslem (11)
| Dwyane Wade (14)
| American Airlines Arena19,600
| 31–31
|- bgcolor="#bbffbb"
| 63
| March 6
| Atlanta
| 
| Dwyane Wade (38)
| Quentin Richardson (11)
| Dwyane Wade (10)
| American Airlines Arena19,600
| 32–31
|- bgcolor="#ffcccc"
| 64
| March 9
| @ Charlotte
| 
| Dwyane Wade (27)
| Udonis Haslem (11)
| Carlos Arroyo (5)
| Time Warner Cable Arena18,646
| 32–32
|- bgcolor="#bbffbb"
| 65
| March 10
| L.A. Clippers
| 
| Dwyane Wade (27)
| Udonis Haslem (10)
| Dwyane Wade (8)
| American Airlines Arena14,785
| 33–32
|- bgcolor="#bbffbb"
| 66
| March 12
| Chicago
| 
| Jermaine O'Neal (25)
| Joel Anthony (10)
| Dwyane Wade (7)
| American Airlines Arena19,600
| 34–32
|- bgcolor="#bbffbb"
| 67
| March 14
| Philadelphia
| 
| Dwyane Wade (38)
| Udonis Haslem (12)
| Carlos Arroyo (10)
| American Airlines Arena18,129
| 35–32
|- bgcolor="#ffcccc"
| 68
| March 16
| San Antonio
| 
| Dwyane Wade (28)
| Udonis Haslem (12)
| Dwyane Wade (5)
| American Airlines Arena18,925
| 35–33
|- bgcolor="#ffcccc"
| 69
| March 18
| Orlando
| 
| Dwyane Wade (36)
| Dwyane Wade (10)
| Dwyane Wade (7)
| American Airlines Arena18,874
| 35–34
|- bgcolor="#bbffbb"
| 70
| March 20
| Charlotte
| 
| Quentin Richardson (18)
| Udonis Haslem (13)
| Dwyane Wade (9)
| American Airlines Arena18,766
| 36–34
|- bgcolor="#bbffbb"
| 71
| March 22
| @ New Jersey
| 
| Dwyane Wade (27)
| Jermaine O'Neal (9)
| Dwyane Wade (12)
| IZOD Center11,934
| 37–34
|- bgcolor="#bbffbb"
| 72
| March 25
| @ Chicago
| 
| Jermaine O'Neal (24)
| Quentin Richardson (8)
| Dwyane Wade (10)
| United Center21,592
| 38–34
|- bgcolor="#bbffbb"
| 73
| March 26
| @ Milwaukee
| 
| Dwyane Wade (30)
| Udonis Haslem (18)
| Dwyane Wade (7)
| Bradley Center17,841
| 39–34
|- bgcolor="#bbffbb"
| 74
| March 28
| Toronto
| 
| Dwyane Wade (32)
| Quentin Richardson (9)
| Carlos Arroyo (8)
| American Airlines Arena19,600
| 40–34
|- bgcolor="#bbffbb"
| 75
| March 31
| @ Detroit
| 
| Michael Beasley (28)
| Udonis Haslem (10)
| Carlos Arroyo (8)
| The Palace of Auburn Hills22,076
| 41–34

|- bgcolor="#bbffbb"
| 76
| April 2
| @ Indiana
| 
| Dwyane Wade (43)
| Udonis Haslem (11)
| Dwyane Wade (6)
| Conseco Fieldhouse16,787
| 42–34
|- bgcolor="#bbffbb"
| 77
| April 3
| @ Minnesota
| 
| Dwyane Wade (39)
| Udonis Haslem (17)
| Carlos Arroyo (9)
| Target Center 17,601
| 43–34
|- bgcolor="#bbffbb"
| 78
| April 7
| Philadelphia
| 
| Dwyane Wade (22)
| Udonis Haslem (11)
| Mario Chalmers (5)
| American Airlines Arena18,221
| 44–34
|- bgcolor="#ffcccc"
| 79
| April 9
| Detroit
| 
| Dwyane Wade (19)
| Udonis Haslem (11)
| Dwyane Wade (9)
| American Airlines Arena19,600
| 44–35
|- bgcolor="#bbffbb"
| 80
| April 11
| @ New York
| 
| Dwyane Wade (32)
| Udonis Haslem (10)
| Dwyane Wade (5)
| Madison Square Garden19,763
| 45–35
|- bgcolor="#bbffbb"
| 81
| April 12
| @ Philadelphia
| 
| Dwyane Wade (30)
| Quentin Richardson (12)
| Carlos Arroyo (7)
| Wachovia Center17,401
| 46–35
|- bgcolor="#bbffbb"
| 82
| April 14
| New Jersey
| 
| Michael Beasley (25)
| Michael Beasley (13)
| Mario Chalmers (7)
| American Airlines Arena18,754
| 47–35

Playoffs

Game log 

|- bgcolor="#ffcccc"
| 1
| April 17
| @ Boston
| 
| Dwyane Wade (26)
| Jermaine O'Neal (9)
| Dwyane Wade (6)
| TD Garden18,624
| 0–1
|- bgcolor="#ffcccc"
| 2
| April 20
| @ Boston
| 
| Dwyane Wade (29)
| Michael Beasley (7)
| Dwyane Wade (5)
| TD Garden18,624
| 0–2
|- bgcolor="#ffcccc"
| 3
| April 23
| Boston
| 
| Dwyane Wade (34)
| Udonis Haslem (8)
| Dwyane Wade (8)
| American Airlines Arena19,500
| 0–3
|- bgcolor="#bbffbb"
| 4
| April 25
| Boston
| 
| Dwyane Wade (46)
| Udonis Haslem (11)
| Mario Chalmers, Dwyane Wade (5)
| American Airlines Arena19,520
| 1–3
|- bgcolor="#ffcccc"
| 5
| April 27
| @ Boston
| 
| Dwyane Wade (31)
| Udonis Haslem (10)
| Dwyane Wade (10)
| TD Garden18,624
| 1–4

Player statistics

Regular season 

1Stats with the Heat.

Playoffs

Awards, records and milestones

Awards

Week/Month 

 Dwyane Wade was named Eastern Conference Player of the Week for games played from March 1 through March 7 and from March 22 through 28.
 Dwyane Wade was named Eastern Conference Player of the Month for the month of March.
 Erik Spoelstra was named Eastern Conference Coach of the Month for the month of March.

All-Star 

 Dwyane Wade was voted as an NBA Eastern Conference All-Star starter. (6th appearance)
 Michael Beasley was selected to the Sophomores team in the Rookie Challenge.

Season 

 Dwyane Wade was named MVP of the All-star game.
 Dwyane Wade was named to the All-NBA First Team.
 Dwyane Wade was named to the NBA All-Defensive Second Team.

Records

Milestones 

 On January 16, 2010, Dwyane Wade became the Heat all-time assists leader surpassing Tim Hardaway.

Injuries and surgeries

Transactions 

Miami Heat seasons
Miami
Miami Heat
Miami Heat